Tommaso Caracciolo (1478–1546) was a Roman Catholic prelate who served as 
Archbishop of Capua (1536–1546),
Bishop of Trivento (1502–1540),
Apostolic Nuncio to Naples (1534–1535), and 
Bishop of Capaccio (1523–1531).

Biography
Tommaso Caracciolo was born in 1478. 
On 6 March 1502, he was appointed during the papacy of Pope Alexander VI as Bishop of Trivento.
On 12 June 1523, he was appointed during the papacy of Pope Adrian VI as Bishop of Capaccio. 
In 1531, he resigned as Bishop of Capaccio.
In 1534, he was appointed during the papacy of Pope Clement VII as Apostolic Nuncio to Naples; he resigned from the position in 1535. 
On 28 April 1536, he was appointed during the papacy of Pope Clement VII as Archbishop of Capua. 
In 1540, he resigned as Bishop of Trivento. 
He served as Archbishop of Capua until his death on 31 March 1546.

See also
Catholic Church in Italy

References

External links and additional sources
 (for Chronology of Bishops) 
 (for Chronology of Bishops) 
 (for Chronology of Bishops) 
 (for Chronology of Bishops) 
 (for Chronology of Bishops) 
 (for Chronology of Bishops) 
 (for Chronology of Bishops) 

16th-century Italian Roman Catholic archbishops
Bishops appointed by Pope Alexander VI
Bishops appointed by Pope Adrian VI
Bishops appointed by Pope Clement VII
1478 births
1546 deaths
Apostolic Nuncios to the Kingdom of Naples